Mihran Damadian (1863 – 1945) was an Armenian freedom fighter, political activist, writer and teacher.

He was educated in the Armenian Catholic Moorat-Raphaelian School at Venice, Italy. He then became a teacher in the Sassoun district. With Medzn Mourad, he led the Sassoun Resistance in 1894. He was captured and taken to prison where his captors broke his leg to prevent any possibility of escape. He was sent in chains to Constantinople, and stayed for some time there in prison.

Mihran Damadian was a notable Hunchak (and subsequently a Reformed Hunchak which became known as Ramgavar) activist. He was also the chief negotiator with the French authorities. As negotiator, he proposed that France take the mandate of independent Cilicia in 1920. On 5 August 1920, Damadian declared the independence of Cilicia as an Armenian autonomous republic under French protectorate.

He ran the gauntlet of Turkish guerrillas on the mountain road to Adana.

His grand-grandson is stage and opera director and actor Gerald Papasian.

References

External links 
Mihran Damadian at Armeniapedia.org

1863 births
1945 deaths
Politicians from Istanbul
Armenian fedayi
Armenian nationalists
Armenian revolutionaries
Armenian people of World War I
Armenians from the Ottoman Empire
San Lazzaro degli Armeni alumni
19th-century Armenian politicians